Count Włodzimierz Ksawery Tadeusz Dzieduszycki (22 June 1825 – 18 September 1899) was a Polish noble, landowner, naturalist, political activist, collector and patron of arts of Ruthenian heritage. Włodzimierz became the first Ordynat of the Poturzyca estate. He was owner of the Poturzyca, Zarzecze, Kramarzowka, Markpol, Lachowice, Dobraczyn, Medowa, Jaryszow, Konarzewo, Gluszyn, Wiry and Szczytnik estates and a founder of the Natural History Museum in Lviv. He was one of the first Polish magnates to replace serfdom on his estates.

Biography
He was the son of Józef Kalasanty (1776-1847) and Paulina Anna and was educated in Poland and from 1840 in Göttingen and Paris. In 1846 Wlodzimierz returned to Poland.

During the Spring of Nations in 1848, he became a member of the "Council of the Nation of Lwow" (Centralna Rada Narodowa Lwowska) and pro-Polish organisation Ruski (Ruskyi) Sobor (opposite to the Holovna Ruska Rada).

He was also a member of the "Economic Society of Galicia". In 1855 Dzieduszycki became a cofounder of the Dubliany Ploughing School (today Agricultural Academy). He supported publishing houses, spent money for  scientific works and school books. Dzieduszycki was a great enthusiast of the Hutsul Arts and financed translation into Polish for the work of Volodymyr Shukhevych "Hutsulshchyna". In 1863 he partly financed and participated in the civil organisation of the January Uprising.

In 1881 Wlodzimierz became a member of the Polish Academy of Skills. Dzieduszycki collected specimens of fauna and flora from his childhood and held them in his palace in Poturzyce, 80 km north of Lvov. His collection grew with additions of fossils and minerals from Professor Ludwik Zejszner and plants from Jan Łobarzewski.  He moved a part of this collection to Lvov to a building in Fredro Street in 1854 and then to Kurkowa Street (now Lysenka Street) in 1857. As the collections grew he bought a building in 1868 on Teatralna Street where the museum still stands. It was open to the public in 1870. The museum is now called the State Museum of Natural History of the NASU. The Museum includes a rich natural collection, mainly ornithology, ethnography and numismatic objects and a large collection of books.

He was also co-founder of the Museum of Industry of Arts (Muzeum Przemyslu Artystycznego) in 1874 in Lwów and founder the "Hunting Society of Lesser Poland" in 1885.

Wlodzimierz became a member the Sejm in 1865, 1874 and from 1895 until 1899; he served as Sejm Marshal from 7 March until 26 April 1876. He was also a member of the Herrenhaus from 1874.

He was author of several scientific works (nature and ethnography), and from 1894 Doctor Honoris Causa of the Lwów University.

Family

Włodzimierz married Alfonsyna Miączyńska on 19 September 1853 in Lwów and had four children:

 Countess Klementyna Dzieduszycka
 Countess Anna Dzieduszycka
 Countess Maria Dzieduszycka
 Countess Jadwiga Dzieduszycka, was married to Prince Witold Leon Czartoryski

References

Bibliography
 Gabriel Brzęk – Muzeum im. Dzieduszyckich we Lwowie i jego Twórca

External links
 Forum akademickie – Włodzimierz Dzieduszycki
 Dzieduszycki Museum in Lwów
  Володимир Дідушицький

1825 births
1899 deaths
People from Vinnytsia Oblast
People from Mogilyovsky Uyezd (Podolian Governorate)
Emigrants from the Russian Empire to the Austrian Empire
People from the Russian Empire of Polish descent
Counts of Poland
Marshals of the Diet of Galicia and Lodomeria
Wlodzimierz
Polish biologists
Polish art collectors
Polish curators